Oscar Olivera Foronda (born 1955) was one of the main leaders of the protesters against the water privatization in Bolivia. The result of these protests was an event known as the Cochabamba Water War. Now he is one of the main leaders of the protests in the Bolivian gas conflict. He is also the head of a confederation of factory workers' unions.

Oscar Olivera was awarded the Goldman Environmental Prize in 2001.

In popular culture
Oscar Olivera's role in the Cochabamba Water War is featured in the 2008 documentary film Blue Gold: World Water Wars.

References

2000 riots
Bechtel
Bolivian activists
Water and politics
1955 births
Living people
Place of birth missing (living people)
Goldman Environmental Prize awardees